Tsutomu Matsuda may refer to:

 Tsutomu Matsuda (footballer) (born 1983), Japanese football player
 Tsutomu Matsuda (rugby union) (born 1970), Japanese rugby player